The Street of Adventure is a 1921 British silent drama film directed by Kenelm Foss and starring Lionelle Howard, Margot Drake and Irene Rooke. It was based on the 1919 novel of the same title by Philip Gibbs. The title is a reference to Fleet Street in London.

Premise
A journalist attempts to save a woman from prostitution, but nearly loses his fiancée to another man in the process.

Cast
 Lionelle Howard as Frank Luttrell  
 Margot Drake as Katherine Halstead  
 Irene Rooke as Margaret Hubbard  
 Peggy Bayfield as Peg  
 Roy Travers as Will Brandon  
 Will Corrie as Edmund Grattan  
 H.V. Tollemach

References

Bibliography
 Low, Rachael. History of the British Film, 1918-1929. George Allen & Unwin, 1971.

External links

1921 films
1921 drama films
British silent feature films
British drama films
Films directed by Kenelm Foss
Films based on British novels
Films set in England
Films set in London
British black-and-white films
1920s English-language films
1920s British films
Silent drama films